Eugoa costiplaga is a moth of the family Erebidae. It is found in Gabon.

References

 Natural History Museum Lepidoptera generic names catalog

Endemic fauna of Gabon
costiplaga
Moths described in 1893